Dioryctria taedae is a species of snout moth in the genus Dioryctria. It was described by Schaber and Wood in 1971, and is known from Maryland to the south-eastern United States.

The length of the forewings is about 12 mm. The ground colour of the forewings is very dark brown. The hindwings are smoky grey. There are two generations per year, with adults on wing in late August and again in early October.

The larvae feed on Pinus taeda. The larvae of the first generation attack the terminal shoots of their host plant. The other generation feeds on developing second year cones the following spring.

References

Moths described in 1971
taedae